The Sony Xperia E (C1504/5, 1604/5) is an Android smartphone manufactured by Sony Corporation. The phone was released in March 2013, and is available in single and dual SIM variants.

Core hardware
Xperia E is powered by a 1.008 GHz single core Qualcomm Snapdragon S1 (MSM7227A) processor. The phone has an internal storage of 750 MB, a built-in non-removable 4 GB SD card, (of which 2 GB is accessible by the user) and also supports a Micro SD memory card up to 32 GB. The phone has 512 MB of RAM, of which approximately 409 MB is available to the user. It also has an Adreno 200 GPU, clocked to 245 MHz.

Display
Xperia E has a 3.5 inch TFT capacitive scratch-resistant touch-screen that supports multi-touch up to 2 fingers. The display has a 320 x 480 pixel resolution, and supports 262,000 colours.

Software
Xperia E runs on Android 4.1.1 Jellybean, with the proprietary Timescape User Interface of Sony.

Other features
Xperia E has a 3.15 MP rear camera, that can capture still photos and videos. It does not have a front camera. It also has Bluetooth v2.1 + EDR with A2DP, Assisted GPS and Wi-Fi IEEE 802.11b/g/n. It supports 3G HSDPA mobile data up to 7.2 Mbps, 2G EDGE up to 237 kbit/s, and 2G GPRS up to 68 kbit/s.At the time of discontinuation, the price was $170 AUD for the single SIM variant.

References

External links
 

Android (operating system) devices
Mobile phones introduced in 2013
Discontinued smartphones
Sony smartphones